Philip Tuckniss (born May 5, 1962) is a retired tennis player from Zimbabwe, who represented his native country as a qualifier at the 1988 Summer Olympics in Seoul, South Korea. There he lost in the second round of the men's doubles competition to Sweden's eventual bronze medalists Anders Järryd and Stefan Edberg, while partnering Mark Gurr. He has been happily married since 1997.

Tuckniss now lives in Chattanooga, TN where he works on old homes. When he finished playing tennis professionally, he taught tennis for 15 years, and then slowed down to doing few individual lessons, but has no current students.

External links
 
 

1962 births
Living people
Zimbabwean male tennis players
Tennis players at the 1988 Summer Olympics
Olympic tennis players of Zimbabwe
Place of birth missing (living people)
White Zimbabwean sportspeople